The 2018 League of Ireland Cup Final was the final match of the 2018 League of Ireland Cup, played between Derry City and Cobh Ramblers. The match was played on 16 September 2018. The match was won by Derry City, who claimed their record 11th League Cup trophy. The final was shown live on Eir Sport
and was Cobh Ramblers first ever national cup final appearance.

Match

See also
 2018 FAI Cup
 2018 League of Ireland Premier Division
 2018 League of Ireland Cup

References

League of Ireland Cup finals
League Cup Final
Cup